António Fwaminy da Costa Fernandes aka Tony da Costa Fernandes (Cabinda,  26 April 1942) is an Angolan politician. He served as UNITA's representative to the United Kingdom.  Along with Jonas Savimbi, he was co-founder of UNITA.

Costa Fernandes studied with Savimbi, the future leader of UNITA, in Switzerland. In November 1963 they went to Portugal, planning an uprising against Portuguese colonial authorities in Angola.

Later, when UNITA allied with the People's Republic of China, Costa Fernandes recruited the first refugees in Zambia to go to China for military training. He went along with fourteen other men.

Served as the Foreign Minister of UNITA.

In the 1990s Fernandes and UNITA Interior Minister General Miguel N'Zau Puna allegedly uncovered the fact that UNITA leader Jonas Savimbi ordered the assassinations of both Wilson dos Santos, UNITA's representative to Portugal, and Tito Chingunji, one of Costa Fernandes' predecessors. Dos Santos and Chingunji's deaths and the defections of Fernandes and Puna weakened the U.S.-UNITA relationship and seriously harmed Savimbi's international reputation.

References

People of the Angolan Civil War
Angolan rebels
UNITA politicians
Ambassadors of Angola to Egypt
1935 births
Living people
Angolan revolutionaries